This '''comparison of optical character recognition software includes:
 OCR engines, that do the actual character identification
 Layout analysis software, that divide scanned documents into zones suitable for OCR
 Graphical interfaces to one or more OCR engines
 Software development kits that are used to add OCR capabilities to other software (e.g. forms processing applications, document imaging management systems, e-discovery systems, records management solutions)

Evaluation
A 2016 analysis of  the accuracy and reliability of the OCR packages Google Docs OCR, Tesseract, ABBYY FineReader, and Transym, employing a dataset including 1227 images from 15 different categories concluded Google Docs OCR and ABBYY to be performing better than others.

References 

Computer libraries
Optical character recognition
Optical character recognition
Software development kits